Patricia Eileen Marmont (9 August 1921 – 3 December 2020) was an American-born British actress in Hollywood films and on television, and a theatrical agent. Marmont's best known role was as the Trojan princess Andromache in the 1956 film Helen of Troy. She played Lady de Courcier in The Adventures of Robin Hood episode "The Miser" (1956).

Life and career
Marmont was born in August 1921 in Beechhurst, Queens, New York, the daughter of film actor Percy Marmont. During World War II, she served in the Women's Army Corps (WAC) and was stationed in England. In 1949, she starred opposite Cary Grant in the 1949 film I Was a Male War Bride, in which she portrayed a lieutenant from Boston, Massachusetts based in England during wartime. For a period, she was married to character actor Nigel Green. The two later divorced, and Green died from an accidental overdose of sleeping tablets in 1972.

She retired from acting in the 1970s and relocated to London. During this period, Marmont become a theatrical agent, working first with Larry Dalzell (1933–2011) for many years. In 1983 she formed her own company, Marmont Management Ltd, and became hugely successful, representing the likes of actors William H. Macy, Guy Henry, Patricia Routledge, Kenneth Branagh, Alex Jennings, and Julia Ormond.

Personal life and death
Marmont had a sister, Pamela (1923–1999), who became a successful actress in her own right. Pam Marmont was married to fellow actor Moray Watson, who died in 2017.

She died at Denville Hall in Northwood, London, England in December 2020 at the age of 99.

Filmography

References

External links

1921 births
2020 deaths
American expatriates in the United Kingdom
American film actresses
Women's Army Corps soldiers
People from Long Island
21st-century American women